The lenis woolly bat (Kerivoula lenis) is a species of bat in the family Vespertilionidae. It is found in South and Southeast Asia.

Taxonomy and etymology
It was described as a new species in 1916 by British zoologist Oldfield Thomas.
It was previously considered to be a specimen of K. papillosa. Its species name "lenis" is Latin for "soft."

Description 
The bats have russet brown dorsal pelage and gray brown ventral pelage.

The species has a forearm length of 37.2-40.2 mm.

Range and habitat
It is found in Tamil Nadu in India, and the Malaysian and Indonesian portions of Borneo.

It has been observed in forest understories.

Conservation 
The bat has been assessed by the IUCN as least-concern due to its large range, presumed large population, and lack of significant population decline.

It is known to occur in some protected areas in Borneo.

References

Kerivoulinae
Taxa named by Oldfield Thomas
Bats of Asia
Mammals described in 1916